The 2009 FINA Men's Water Polo World League was the eighth edition of the annual event, organised by the world's governing body in aquatics, the FINA. After a preliminary round organized by continent, the Super Final was held in Podgorica, Montenegro, from 16 June to 21 June 2009.

The field included 19 teams, following the withdrawal of two teams. Two nations, South Africa and Libya, had their World League debut, with Libya competing in its first major international tournament.

Preliminary round

Africa
 
The African tournament will be held in Casablanca, Morocco, from 22 May to 24 May. One team from the group of four will advance. South Africa and Libya will make their World League debuts.

22 May

23 May

24 May

25 May

Americas
 qualified without a qualification tournament.

Asia/Oceania
 
The Asia and Oceania region will feature a two-legged tournament, in Adelaide, Australia (22–24 May), and Auckland, New Zealand (29–31 May). The four teams will play a round robin in each location, with the results from both legs combined. The top two teams from the group of four will advance.

22 May

23 May

24 May

29 May

30 May

31 May

Europe

Europe is divided into three groups, with qualifying spots for the winner of each group as well as Super Final host Montenegro. The initial plan was for each group to have four teams. However, Great Britain and Hungary have dropped out.

Rather than the condensed tournament style competition of the other continents, the European matches will be played in a home-and-away format over five months. The pool-based nature of the qualification process, however, continues to be used.

Europe A
Reference:

Hungary was to have played in this group.

21 January

17 February

10 March

29 April

5 May

12 May

Europe B
Reference:

Great Britain was to have been the fourth member of this group, but withdrew.

21 January

17 February

3 March

15 April

5 May

12 May

Europe C
Reference:

21 January

17 February

10 March

31 March

14 April

5 May

8 May

12 May

Super Final

The Super Final will be held in Podgorica, Montenegro, from 16 June to 21 June.

Group 1

16 June

17 June

18 June

Group 2

16 June

17 June

18 June

Quarterfinals

19 June

5th-8th places

Medal round

Final ranking

Awards

References

2009
W
W
International water polo competitions hosted by Montenegro